Aleksandr Aleksandrovich Kurnayev (born 1 July 1985) is a former Russian professional football player.

Club career
He played in the Russian Football National League for FC Dynamo Saint Petersburg in 2010.

External links
 
 

1985 births
Living people
Russian footballers
Association football midfielders
FC Zenit Saint Petersburg players
FC SKA Rostov-on-Don players
FC Lukhovitsy players
FC Dynamo Vologda players
FC Dynamo Saint Petersburg players
FK Žalgiris players
FC Sever Murmansk players
A Lyga players
Russian expatriate footballers
Expatriate footballers in Lithuania